Terrance E. Bowen (born September 15, 1971 Madera County, California) is an American former sprinter.

References

1971 births
Living people
American male sprinters
Universiade medalists in athletics (track and field)
People from Madera, California
Universiade gold medalists for the United States
Universiade bronze medalists for the United States
Medalists at the 1995 Summer Universiade